Acrodipsas hirtipes, the hirtipes ant-blue or black ant-blue, is a butterfly of the family Lycaenidae. It is found in the Northern Territory and on the Cape York Peninsula in Australia.

The wingspan is about 20 mm.

References

External links
Australian Caterpillars

Acrodipsas
Butterflies of Australia
Butterflies described in 1980